= 2001 Slovenian fertility treatment referendum =

- 17 June 2001
- Are you in favor of the law on amendments and additions to the law on infertility treatment and biomedically assisted fertilization procedures (EPA 1318-II), adopted by the National Assembly on 19 April 2001?

Results
Choice	Votes	%
Yes	149,799	26.72%
No	410,856	73.28%
Valid votes	560,655	98.74%
Invalid or blank votes	7,129	1.26%
Total votes	567,784	100.00%
Registered voters/turnout	1,592,650	35.65%

A referendum on allowing unmarried women to have fertility treatment was held in Slovenia on 17 June 2001. The proposal was rejected by 73.3% of voters, with a turnout of only 35.7%.

== Results ==
Choice	Votes	%
For	149,799	26.7
Against	410,856	73.3
Invalid/blank votes	7,129	–
Total	567,784	100
Registered voters/turnout	1,592,650	35.7
Source: Nohlen & Stöver
